Llanhilleth is a village, community and an electoral ward on the A467 road between Ebbw Vale and Crumlin in Blaenau Gwent, Wales.

Two large mounds in the field behind the Carpenter's Arms are the remains of the medieval Llanhilleth castle which originally had two large, stone-built towers.

Part of the Monmouthshire Canal ran through the parish; the Ebbw River forms the western boundary of the parish.

The twin-belled Church in Wales church of St Mark is located on Brooklyn Terrace, near the High Street junction. It is in the benefice of Abertillery with Cwmtillery with Llanhilleth with Six Bells, in the deanery of Pontypool, and was built in 1898.

Nearby are the villages of Aberbeeg and St Illtyd, within the community, the latter of which contains the former parish church. In the far south of the community is the village of Swffryd.

Facilities 
The village contains the Miners Institute, which provides many essential ceremonies for locals, such as Weddings, Christenings and Funeral Receptions. The building is connected to St. Illtyd's Primary School, which supplies for ages 3 to 11.

The Llanhilleth Rugby Club sits along a road sprouting off the A467, at the entrance from Crumlin.

See also
Llanhilleth railway station, reopened in 2008
List of schools in Blaenau Gwent

External links
Llanhilleth Miners Institute
Llanhilleth Rugby Club
Llanhilleth Colliery
Contemporary photos of Llanhilleth

References

Villages in Blaenau Gwent
Wards of Blaenau Gwent
Communities in Blaenau Gwent